William Mercer ( – ) was an English  professional rugby league footballer who played in the 1920s and 1930s.

Background
Billy Mercer's birth was registered in Prescot district, Lancashire, England, he was a joiner for St. Helens Council, and he died aged 59 in St. Helens district, Lancashire, England.

Playing career

International honours
Billy Mercer won a cap for England while at St. Helens in the 19–35 defeat by Other Nationalities at Thrum Hall, Halifax on Monday 7 April 1930.

County honours
Bill Mercer made his début for Lancashire in the 15–7 victory over Cumberland at Whitehaven on Tuesday 29 October 1929, alongside fellow St. Helens player Alf Ellaby who scored three tries, Mercer had two further victories alongside Alf Ellaby, against Yorkshire and Glamorgan and Monmouthshire as Lancashire won the County Championship.

Championship final appearances
Bill Mercer played right-, i.e. number 3, in St. Helens' 9–5 victory over Huddersfield in the Championship Final during the 1931–32 season at Belle Vue, Wakefield on Saturday 7 May 1932.

County League appearances
Bill Mercer played in St. Helens' victories in the Lancashire County League during the 1929–30 season and 1931–32 season.

Challenge Cup Final appearances
Bill Mercer played left-, i.e. number 4, in St. Helens' 3–10 defeat by Widnes in the 1929–30 Challenge Cup Final at Wembley Stadium, London on Saturday 3 May 1930, in front of a crowd of 36,544.

Club career
Bill Mercer made his début for St. Helens in the 15–3 victory over Batley at Knowsley Road on Saturday 26 September 1925, and scored his first try in the 55–6 victory over Bradford Northern at Odsal Stadium on Wednesday 14 April 1926, his last match was the 7–25 defeat by Warrington at Knowsley Road on Saturday 6 November 1937.

References

External links

1905 births
1965 deaths
England national rugby league team players
English rugby league players
Lancashire rugby league team players
Place of death missing
Rugby league centres
Rugby league locks
Rugby league players from St Helens, Merseyside
Rugby league second-rows
Rugby league wingers
St Helens R.F.C. players